Leordoaia may refer to:
 Leordoaia, Hîrjauca Commune, Călăraşi district, Moldova
 Leordoaia, Hîrceşti Commune, Ungheni district, Moldova